A Kid's Point of View is the first studio album by American singer Dijon Prioleau. Reviews for the album have been mixed with SoulTracks rating the album as "mildly recommended" while GospelFlava.com says it is "real, genuine, a great listen."

Track listing
"A Kid's Point of View" (Todd Muhammad, Troy Taylor) – 3:42
"He Is Lord" (Muhammad, Larry Campbell) – 3:41
"Worthy Lamb" (Asaph A. Ward) – 4:34
"Real Love" (Ward) – 3:44
"My Potential" (Muhammad, Campbell) – 3:40
"Give Praise" (Ward) – 4:15
"I Wanna Be More Like Him" (Muhammad, Campbell) – 3:19
"Pressures" (Ward) – 3:38
"I Know Better" (Muhammad, Campbell) – 3:46
"Jesus Will Know" (Muhammad, Campbell) – 3:48
"How Great Is Our God" (Ward) – 3:46

References 

2007 debut albums
Dijon Prioleau albums